Philip or Filip was King of Sweden from c. 1105–1110 until 1118.

He was a son of King Halsten Stenkilsson and nephew of King Inge the Elder. Philip and his brother Inge the Younger ruled together from 1105 or 1110 and onwards as successors of their uncle King Inge the Elder. According to the records of the Westrogothic law (Västgötalagen) he was a good king. Little else is known about him. Hardly any other Swedish king who was the undisputed ruler of the kingdom after the Christianization is less known than Philip.

According to the Hervarar saga, he ruled only for a short time and was married to Ingegard, the daughter of the Norwegian king Harald Hardrada. Philip was probably buried with his brother Inge the Younger in Vreta Abbey (Vreta kloster och kyrka) at Linköping in  Östergötland, Sweden.

References

Other sources
David Williamson (1991) in Debrett's Kings and Queens of Europe  (Salem House Publishing. p. 122) 

12th-century Swedish monarchs
Year of birth unknown
1118 deaths
House of Stenkil
Burials at Vreta Abbey
Sons of kings